Yaakov Neuburger (born July 1955) is a rosh yeshiva at Rabbi Isaac Elchanan Theological Seminary (RIETS), Yeshiva University, in New York City. Rabbi Neuberger is also the Rabbi of Congregation Beth Abraham in Bergenfield, New Jersey, a position he has held since 1990.

Rabbi Neuburger received semicha from Rabbi Isaac Elchanan Theological Seminary in 1979. He also holds a master's degree in psychology from Columbia University.

Rabbi Neuburger is one of the most authoritative Rabbis in YU regarding issues related to marital relationships and the purity of the Jewish home.  He offers his services to help young men train for married life, and prepare to build a proper Jewish home, built on Jewish law and spirit.

Online articles
 TorahWeb articles, audio, and video

1955 births
Living people
American Orthodox rabbis
Modern Orthodox rabbis
People from Bergen County, New Jersey
Teachers College, Columbia University alumni
Yeshiva University rosh yeshivas
20th-century American rabbis
21st-century American rabbis